Clara Matsuno (松 野 ク ラ ラ, 2 August 1853 – 1931 or 1941), born Clara Louise Zitelmann, was a German-born educator, a pioneer in the kindergarten movement in Japan.

Early life 
Clara Louise Zitelmann was born and educated in Berlin, the daughter of Carl Friedrich Zitelmann and Emma Pauline Ulrike Zitelmann.

Career 
In 1876, Matsuno became the first head teacher at the first kindergarten in Japan, with Froebel-inspired methods emphasizing outdoor play, puzzles, songs and games. The school's principal, Shinzo Seki, translated for her, as she did not speak Japanese upon arrival in Japan. She was also a teacher-training instructor at the Tokyo College of Education for Women from 1876 to 1881. She also taught English and German, and gave piano lessons for the Imperial Household Agency.

Personal life and legacy 
Clara Louise Zitelmann married  (松 野 礀) in Ueno in 1876; the couple met in Berlin, where Matsuno was studying forestry. They were the first German-Japanese couple married in Japan; she became a Japanese citizen by marriage. They had a daughter, Frieda Fumi, who died in 1901, at age 24. Matsuno's husband died in 1908; for a time she lived with her sister and sister-in-law in Japan. She died in Germany in 1931, aged 77 years; some sources give her death date as 1941.

In 1976, the Japanese post office released a postage stamp honoring Clara Matsuno on the centennial of her founding the kindergarten program at the Tokyo College of Education for Women. There is a monument honoring Matsuno in the Aoyama Cemetery in Tokyo.

References

External links 

 A painting illustrating a kindergarten class playing a game (Pigeon's Nest) led by Clara Matsuno, from the Ochanomizu University Digital Archives.

1853 births
1931 deaths
German educators
Japanese educators
19th-century German educators
19th-century Japanese women